Tom Hugo Hermansen (born 27 October 1979), better known as simply Tom Hugo, is a Norwegian singer, songwriter and musician. He is currently living in Oslo.

Career

Recording artist
In 2007, Hugo moved to Hamburg and started working with Káme Entertainment and All Access Entertainment. In 2009, I apologise EP was released on the indie-label BrilJant/Indigo.  He released his debut-album Sundry Tales in Germany June 2012. The single "Open Up Your Eyes" released in summer 2011 peaked at #100 on German radio-charts.

Sundry Tales was also released in Norway on HW Records/Musikkoperatørene, and peaked at 23rd place on the Norwegian charts. The single "Open Up Your Eyes" peaked at #20 on the Norwegian radio-charts, and follow-up single "Million Doors" was A-listed 12 weeks at Norway's largest radio-station (NRK P1).

Hugo has played many live-shows in both his home-countries, including a support-tour for The Overtones and festivals like Palmesus 2012, Welt Astra Tag, Reeperbahn-festival and Quart 09. He has also played live on the TV shows ZDF MorgenMagazin and God Morgen Norge (TV2-Norway), and was in the prime-time TV show Beat for Beat in Norway on 23 September 2012.

Melodi Grand Prix

In 2013, he participated for the first time in the Melodi Grand Prix with the song "Det er du" (It is You). However, he did not qualify for the Final. In 2018, he participated for the second time with the song "I Like I Like I Like". However, he did not qualify for the Gold Final. In 2019, he participated for the third time as part of the supergroup KEiiNO, who won and later represented Norway at Eurovision Song Contest 2019 with the song "Spirit in the Sky". He and KEiiNO would return again for the 2021 contest with the song "Monument" which received direct qualification to the grand final, placing second behind Tix and his song ''Fallen Angel''.

Radiojam
As well as being an artist and songwriter, Hugo is one of the vocalists in the Norwegian band Radiojam.

Songwriting
Tom Hugo has co-written songs for artists in Europe and Asia. In Japan, Korean supergroup TVXQ released "Very Merry Xmas" on 27 November 2013, a song co-written by Tom and Chris Busek. In summer 2013, Hugo co-wrote the B-side "Sunny Day Hero" taken from SHINee's gold-selling maxi-single "Boys Meet U".

He has written 3 tracks together with Y'akoto for her album Baby Blues, released by Warner Bros. Germany in 2012. The co-written single "Without You" did fairly well on radio. The album peaked at #20 in Germany, and was nominated for an Echo award in 2013. Together with Finnish songwriter Erik Nyholm, he wrote the single "Hard to Love You" performed by [Sebastian Wurth] which was released in 2011. The single peaked at #18 on the German charts. In 2010, Meg Pfeiffer recorded "Love is Easy" co-written by Tom Hugo, Tebey and Sebastian Kirchner for her album Bullrider (#63 on German charts). Hugo was until recently signed by Universal Music Publishing in Germany.

Personal life
Hugo is openly gay. He married his partner, Alexander Nyborg Olsson, on 4 December 2018. The pair wrote "Spirit In The Sky" together, alongside Keiino's other members.

Discography

Studio albums

Extended plays

Singles

References

External links

Living people
1979 births
Norwegian songwriters
Musicians from Kristiansand
Melodi Grand Prix contestants
Melodi Grand Prix composers
Eurovision Song Contest entrants of 2019
Norwegian expatriates in Germany
21st-century Norwegian male singers
Gay singers
Gay songwriters
Norwegian gay musicians
Norwegian LGBT singers
Norwegian LGBT songwriters
20th-century Norwegian LGBT people
21st-century Norwegian LGBT people